Name T. C. Hope may refer to :-

 Thomas Charles Hope - a Scottish physician and chemist.
 Theodore Cracraft Hope - a British born civil servant of the Government of India and also author of many books.